William Fawcett Thompson (September 8, 1894 – January 25, 1974) was an American character actor who appeared in hundreds of films and television episodes. Because there were other actors named William Thompson he used his first and middle name when seeking acting roles. He was best known for playing Pete Wilkey in the television series Fury which ran from 1955 to 1960.

Early life
Fawcett's father was a Methodist minister, and after Fawcett attended Hamline University he became licensed to preach in 1916. During World War I, he joined the United States Army, serving as an ambulance driver. The French government honored him with the Legion of Honour for his care of the wounded. After his military service, Fawcett became a teacher of English and literature at the University of Nebraska-Lincoln and, after earning a Ph.D. degree in Elizabethan drama from the University of Nebraska, he became a professor of theatre arts at Michigan State University. In 1925 he married Helene Krag.

Acting career
At the age of 52, Fawcett obtained his first film role in the 1946 Eddie Dean movie Stars Over Texas. He was soon finding steady work acting in movie serials, including Adventures of Sir Galahad (1949), Batman and Robin (1949), and Cody of the Pony Express (1950) Many of Fawcett's film roles were in B movies, such as 1953's The Neanderthal Man but he also had small roles in major movies. He played Cubby Crouch in the 1955 George Montgomery film Seminole Uprising and Fawcett was cast as a card player in the 1961 John Wayne movie The Comancheros.

Fawcett had roles in seven episodes of The Roy Rogers Show, five episodes of [[The Lone Ranger (TV series)|The Lone Ranger]], as well as episodes of The Adventures of Rin Tin Tin and other westerns.

In 1955, Fawcett was cast in the role of Pete Wilkey, the raspy-voiced combination housekeeper and ranch hand on the western television series Fury. During the series' opening sequence, the narrator states that Fawcett's character, Pete, cut his teeth on a branding iron. In the first episode, "Joey Finds a Friend", Pete says the captured wild stallion was filled with fire and fury, thus giving the horse his name. Fawcett appeared in all 116 episodes of Fury, which was broadcast Saturday mornings on NBC from 1955 through 1960.

Fawcett also had a starring role in Gene Barry's TV Western Bat Masterson; appeared in a 1961 episode of Maverick titled "Poker Face" starring Jack Kelly; as the town Sheriff in "Six Feet of Gold" (1960 - S2E20) and in Gunsmoke'' as "Turner" in the 1963 S9E8's "Carter Caper", and as "Packy" in the 1959 S5E8 episode "Box of Rocks".

Death and burial 
Fawcett died of cardiovascular disease at 79 years of age on January 25, 1974, in Sherman Oaks, California. He is buried at Roselawn Cemetery, in Roseville, Minnesota. His grave has a World War I veteran’s marker.

References

American male film actors
American male television actors
1894 births
1974 deaths
Male Western (genre) film actors
Western (genre) television actors